Mors Viri is the fifth album by Officium Triste, released in 2013 by Hammerheart Records.

Track listing
  "Your Fall from Grace"   – 7:15
  "Burning All Boats and Bridges"   – 6:03
  "Your Heaven, My Underworld"   – 5:36
  "Interludium"   – 1:37  
  "To the Gallows"   – 6:58
  "The Wounded and the Dying"   – 6:35
  "One with the Sea (Part II)"   – 3:23
  "Like Atlas"   – 10:08

Personnel
 Pim Blankenstein – vocals
 Bram Bijlhout – rhythm guitar
 Martin Kwakernaak – keyboards
 Niels Jordaan – drums
 Gerard de Jong – lead guitar
 Lawrence Meyer – bass guitar

References 

Officium Triste albums
2013 albums